Henny Hughes is a thoroughbred race horse.  A foal of 2003, he was a contender for the Triple Crown in 2006.  He was taken off the Triple Crown trail in March 2006, then recorded three sprint victories in stakes races before failing in the Breeders' Cup Sprint, finishing 14th and last. He was retired to stud at the end of the 2006 racing season.  His best-known offspring is the champion mare Beholder.

Connections

Henny Hughes is owned by Zabeel Racing International and was originally trained by Patrick Biancone but was later transferred to Kiaran McLaughlin.  He has been ridden by Gary Stevens, Edgar Prado, Joe Bravo, and John Velazquez.  The horse was bred in Kentucky by Liberation Farm, Trackside Farm & CHO, LLC.

Breeding

Henny Hughes is the son of Hennessy out of the mare Meadow Flyer.  His sire is a son of Storm Cat.  His pedigree includes such notable horses as Secretariat and Bold Ruler.

Retirement
It was announced on November 6, 2006, that Henny Hughes would not race as a four-year-old and would be retired to stud. He stood at Darley Stable at an initial stud fee of $40,000.

Sired Hall of Fame super mare Beholder.  Winner of 3 Breeder's Cup races and 13 other graded wins.

Racing career

References
 Henny Hughes' pedigree
 NTRA bio

2003 racehorse births
Racehorses trained in the United States
Racehorses bred in Kentucky
Thoroughbred family 25